The 2020 IFSC Climbing World Cup was the 32nd edition of the World Cup held by the International Federation of Sport Climbing. It was scheduled to be held in 12 locations across three climbing disciplines, bouldering, lead and speed, due to the COVID-19 pandemic concerns, only one event was held, the Lead World Cup at Briançon in August, while all other World Cups were canceled.

Original schedule
The 2020 IFSC Climbing World Cup was initially scheduled to be held in 12 locations, with six events each for the three climbing disciplines, bouldering, lead and speed, starting on 3 April and concluding on 11 October, with a break in August for the 2020 Summer Olympic Games.

Revised schedule
Following cancellations of events due to the COVID-19 pandemic, the IFSC announced a revised schedule of events. The modified schedule reduced the number of events to six, starting with a lead competition Briançon, France in August and ending with a speed and boulder competition in Xiamen, China in December. The IFSC further announced that it would not award official champions for the 2020 season.

Adam Ondra and Laura Rogora won the gold at Briançon for the men and women, respectively. Alex Megos, who finished fifth in the men's category, wrote a social media post criticised holding the event in the face of travel restrictions, meaning only European athletes could attend, and what he described as inconsistent masking and social distancing requirements.

However, three of the events scheduled in China were canceled in July after the Government of China ordered all international sporting events to be halted for the remainder of the year. In September 2020, following the Lead World Cup in Briançon in August, the IFSC announced the cancellation of the two remaining events, the Speed and Bouldering World Cups in Seoul, South Korea and Salt Lake City, United States, making Briançon World Cup the only world climbing event of the 2020 season.

Results

Lead World Cup Briançon

Women

Men

Medal table

See also
 Impact of the COVID-19 pandemic on sports
 2020 IFSC Climbing European Championships

References

IFSC Climbing World Cup
World Cup
IFSC